Barone is a surname. Notable people with the surname include:

 Enrico Barone, Italian economist (1859– 1924)
 Éric Barone (sportsman), a French athlete who beat the world speed record on a bicycle (1960–)
Eric Barone, also known as ConcernedApe, the creator of the 2016 video game Stardew Valley.
 Evelīna Barone (born 2003), Latvian female curler
 Michael Barone (disambiguation), several notable people with that name
 Onofrio Barone (born 1964), Italian football coach and former player
 Richard Barone, American rock musician
 Simone Barone (born 1978), Italian football manager and former player
 Tony Barone (1946–2019), American basketball coach

Fictional characters:
 Ray Barone, the main character in the show Everybody Loves Raymond

Italian-language surnames